Thelyphassa lineata, known commonly as the striped lax beetle, is a species of false blister beetle endemic to New Zealand.

Description 
Adults of the species are 15 mm long. The body is a golden-brown colour with two black stripes along either side of the abdomen and a single black stripe along the pronotum.

Behaviour & Diet 

The grub of this species live in rotten forest logs. Adults are thought to feed on pollen and nectar.

Toxicology 
The striped lax beetle secretes Cantharidin, a burn agent that causes skin blisters on contact. This was first observed in the late 1980s when 74 personnel from the New Zealand Army reported blistered skin after coming into contact with the species.

References 

Insects described in 1775
Endemic fauna of New Zealand
Oedemeridae
Taxa named by Johan Christian Fabricius
Endemic insects of New Zealand